The 2018 Boyd Gaming 300 was the 3rd stock car race of the 2018 NASCAR Xfinity Series season, and the 22nd iteration of the event. The race was held on Saturday, March 3, 2018 in North Las Vegas, Nevada at Las Vegas Motor Speedway, a 1.5 miles (2.4 km) permanent D-shaped oval racetrack. The race took the scheduled 200 laps to complete. At race's end, Kyle Larson of Chip Ganassi Racing would dominate and hold off the field on the final restart with 6 to go to win the race, the 9th NASCAR Xfinity Series win of his career and the 1st of his part-time season. To fill out the podium, Christopher Bell for Joe Gibbs Racing and Justin Allgaier of JR Motorsports would finish second and third, respectively.

Background 

Las Vegas Motor Speedway, located in Clark County, Nevada outside the Las Vegas city limits and about 15 miles northeast of the Las Vegas Strip, is a 1,200-acre (490 ha) complex of multiple tracks for motorsports racing. The complex is owned by Speedway Motorsports, Inc., which is headquartered in Charlotte, North Carolina.

Entry list

Practice

First practice 
The first practice was held on Friday, March 2 at 12:05 PM PST.

Second and final practice 
The second and final practice was held on Friday, March 2 at 2:05 PM PST.

Qualifying 
Qualifying would take place on Saturday, March 3, at 10:05 AM PST. Since Las Vegas Motor Speedway is under 2 miles (3.2 km), the qualifying system was a multi-car system that included three rounds. The first round was 15 minutes, where every driver would be able to set a lap within the 15 minutes. Then, the second round would consist of the fastest 24 cars in Round 1, and drivers would have 10 minutes to set a lap. Round 3 consisted of the fastest 12 drivers from Round 2, and the drivers would have 5 minutes to set a time. Whoever was fastest in Round 3 would win the pole.

No drivers would fail to qualify.

Full qualifying results

Race results 
Stage 1 Laps: 45

Stage 2 Laps: 45

Stage 3 Laps: 110

References 

2018 NASCAR Xfinity Series
NASCAR races at Las Vegas Motor Speedway
March 2018 sports events in the United States
2018 in sports in Nevada